Gary Ray Kerkorian (January 14, 1930 – May 22, 2000) was an Armenian-American football quarterback who played four seasons in the National Football League.

College career
Born into an Armenian family, Kerkorian attended Inglewood High School in Los Angeles County, and then was a quarterback at Stanford University, where he was a three-year starter. At the end of his senior season of 1951, he held every Stanford passing record and was named a first-team All-American, leading the Indians to a 9-1 record, the Pac-8 championship, and a Rose Bowl berth. He is a member of the Stanford Athletic Hall of Fame.

NFL career
He was drafted by the Pittsburgh Steelers in the 1952 NFL Draft, and saw duty as both a quarterback and placekicker.

He was traded to the Baltimore Colts and emerged as the starting quarterback for the 1954 season, though the Colts' record was a dismal 3-9. The Colts won the lottery bonus pick for the 1955 NFL Draft, giving them the first overall draft pick. They selected George Shaw, a quarterback from the University of Oregon, and Kerkorian was soon relegated to backup duty. (Coincidentally, Shaw was the younger brother of Tom Shaw, whom Kerkorian had replaced as starting Stanford quarterback in 1949.) The following year, the Colts acquired rookie Johnny Unitas, and Kerkorian slipped to third string.

Rugby
Between the 1952 and 1953 NFL seasons, Kerkorian toured with the United States national rugby league team to Australia, where he played the 5/8 position and kicked many goals.

After football
Kerkorian left football after the 1955 season to attend law school at Georgetown University. After an injury to Unitas in 1958, the Colts called Kerkorian back from law school as a possible replacement, but he did not play.

Kerkorian worked as an attorney in California, and was named a Superior Court Judge in Fresno, California in 1990. He retired in January 2000, and died a few months later.

References

1930 births
2000 deaths
American football placekickers
American football quarterbacks
American rugby league players
Baltimore Colts players
Ethnic Armenian sportspeople
American people of Armenian descent
Georgetown University Law Center alumni
Inglewood High School (California) alumni
Pittsburgh Steelers players
Players of American football from Los Angeles
Stanford Cardinal football players
United States national rugby league team players